The Loolecondera estate was the first tea plantation estate in Sri Lanka (Ceylon) started in 1867 by Scotsman James Taylor, it is situated in Kandy, Sri Lanka.

James Taylor and Loolecondera 

James Taylor started the plantation of tea within  of land in Loolecondera and it grew rapidly. In 1872, he started a tea factory with his latest invention of the tea leaves cutting machine.

He spent most of his life in Loolecondera until his death in 1892.

The authorities of Sri Lanka built a museum at Loolecondera in 1992 to commemorate him.

Loolecondera is a corruption into British English of the native name "Lool kandura" (ලූල් කඳුර in Sinhala). Loolkandura means "the stream full of loola fish"(Channa striata).

See also 

James Taylor (Ceylon)
Ceylon tea
Thomas Lipton

References

External links 
Official Website – Sri Lanka Tea Board
Taylor, Lipton and the Birth of Ceylon Tea

Tea estates in Sri Lanka
Sri Lankan tea
Archaeological protected monuments in Nuwara Eliya District